João Pedro Gomiero da Silva (born 20 June 1997) is a Brazilian footballer who most recently played as a midfielder for Stumptown Athletic in the NISA.

Career

Youth and college 
Gomiero played youth soccer for his secondary school, Colegio Singular in his hometown of São Paulo. After graduating in 2015, he moved to the United States to play college soccer for Campbellsville University. There, he made [x] appearances, scoring [x] goals, and providing [x] assists. In 2017, he transfered to Coker University and played there for two seasons, where he had [x] goals, and [x] assists in [x] total apperances for the school.

Senior 
Upon graduated college, Gomerio played in USL League Two for North Carolina Fusion, where he made [x] total apperances, scoring [x] goals during his first stint there. In 2020, Gomerio joined National Independent Soccer Association side, Stumptown Athletic, where he made [x] apperances with the club. In 2022, he returned to North Carolina Fusion where he captained the side. During the 2022 USL League Two season, the Fusion earned a 11-1-2 record to outright win the South Atlantic Division. In the playoffs, the Fusion reached the National Semi-Finalis. Gomiero led the team with 10 goals while adding an assist in 17 matches. He ended the season as a member of the 2022 League Two All-League Team.

On December 13, 2022, he signed a professional contract to join the Richmond Kickers in USL League One. On March 18, 2023, he came on in the 67th minute of a 0–0 draw against Charlotte Independence marking his first professional match.

References

External links 
João Silva at Campbellsville Athletics

1997 births
Living people
Association football midfielders
Expatriate soccer players in the United States
Brazilian expatriates in the United States
Brazilian expatriate sportspeople in the United States
Brazilian footballers
Footballers from São Paulo
Campbellsville Tigers men's soccer players
Coker Cobras men's soccer players
Stumptown AC players
North Carolina Fusion U23 players
Richmond Kickers players
National Independent Soccer Association players
USL League Two players
USL League One players